Smečno is a town in Kladno District in the Central Bohemian Region of the Czech Republic. It has about 1,900 inhabitants. The historic town centre is well preserved and is protected by law as an urban monument zone.

Geography
The eastern part of the municipal territory with the built-up area lies in the Prague Plateau, the western part lies in the Džbán range.

History
The first written mention of a fortress in Smečno is from 1252. In 1510, Smečno became a market town and in 1515 it became a town.

Sights
Smečno Military Open-Air Museum shows fortifications built in 1935–1938. It is fully equipped and armed fortress, one of the few preserved objects of the External Defense of Prague (so-called Prague Line).

The fortress in Smečno was rebuilt into a late Gothic castle in 1460, and in the 16th century, it was rebuilt into a Renaissance arcaded castle with a Gothic tower. Nowadays the Smečno Castle serves as a retirement home and the Institute of Social Care. Its park is open to the public.

Notable people
Jaroslav Bořita of Martinice (1582–1649), nobleman and a representative of Ferdinand II
Heinrich Clam-Martinic (1863–1932), Austrian statesman, prime minister of Austro-Hungary in 1916–17
Zdeněk Liška (1922–1983), film score composer

References

External links

Cities and towns in the Czech Republic
Populated places in Kladno District